Fate of the Jedi is a series of nine science-fiction novels set in the Star Wars universe. The series is written in three cycles by the authors Aaron Allston, Christie Golden, and Troy Denning.

Overview

The series picks up two years after the end of the Legacy of the Force series, which Aaron Allston and Troy Denning also contributed to.

Outcast 
Outcast was written by Aaron Allston and was released on March 24, 2009. It reached #3 on the New York Times Best Seller list on April 12, 2009.

Omen 
Omen was written by Christie Golden and was released on June 23, 2009. It reached #4 on the New York Times Best Seller list on July 12, 2009.

Abyss 
Abyss was written by Troy Denning and was released on August 18, 2009. It reached #7 on the New York Times Best Seller list on September 6, 2009.

Backlash 
Backlash was written by Aaron Allston and was originally scheduled for release on January 26, 2010, but was moved back to March 9 to give the author time to recover from his 2009 heart attack. The book reached #4 on the New York Times Best Seller list on March 28, 2010.

Allies 
Allies was written by Christie Golden and was released on May 25, 2010. It reached #8 on the New York Times Best Seller list on June 13, 2010.

Vortex 
Vortex was written by Troy Denning and was released on November 30, 2010.

Conviction 
Conviction was written by Allston and was published on May 24, 2011. It reached #3 on the New York Times Best Seller list on June 12, 2011.

Ascension 
Ascension was written by Golden and was published on August 9, 2011. It reached #7 on the New York Times Best Seller list on August 28, 2011.

Apocalypse 
Apocalypse was written by Denning and was published on April 3, 2012. It reached #2 on the New York Times Best Seller list on April 1, 2012.

References

External links

Book series introduced in 2009
Star Wars Legends novels
Series of books